Joseph Muthee (born 1928) is a Kenyan writer and Kikuyu sage who wrote about his experience as a detainee of the British colonial government at Kapenguria during the Mau Mau Uprising. He was released in 1959, and entered politics as the KANU Party Locational Branch Chairman of Magutu between 1960 and 1968. Poor finances eventually forced him to return to horticulture to support his family. He won the Jomo Kenyatta Prize for Literature in 2007 for Kizuizini.

Works

References

Living people
1928 births
Kenyan writers
Kenyan male writers